Rosendal may refer to:

People
Gunnar Rosendal, a Swedish Lutheran priest

Places

Denmark
 Rosendal, a manor house in Faxe, Denmark
 Rosendal, a demolished country house in Copenhagen

Norway
Rosendal, Norway, the administrative center of Kvinnherad municipality in Vestland county, Norway
Barony Rosendal, a historic estate and manor located in Rosendal, Norway

South Africa
Rosendal, Free State, a small farming town in the Free State province, South Africa

Sweden
Rosendal Castle, Helsingborg, a castle in Helsingborg Municipality, Scania province, Sweden
Rosendal Palace, a palace in Djurgården in Stockholm, Sweden

United States
Rosendal, United States Virgin Islands, a village on the island of Saint Thomas in the United States Virgin Islands

See also
Roosendaal
Rosendahl
Rosendale (disambiguation)